The Fitzpatrick Building in Saint Paul, Minnesota, United States, is an 1890 Queen Anne style commercial building featuring corner turret and pressed-metal relief. It is listed on the National Register of Historic Places. 

The Fitzpatrick building was built and designed in 1890 by developer Thomas Fitzpatrick. Known more recently as the Viking Apartments, the building housed low income tenants until being sold in the Spring of 2019 to CCI Properties, who will undertake full restoration of the building into a mixture of affordable and market-rate housing in early 2020. Other upgrades will include a sprinkler system, new electrical systems and restoration of the building's original conical turret.

References

1890s architecture in the United States
National Register of Historic Places in Saint Paul, Minnesota
Commercial buildings on the National Register of Historic Places in Minnesota
Queen Anne architecture in Minnesota